Luther Loren Baxter (June 8, 1832 – May 22, 1915) was an American politician and lawyer.

Baxter was born in Cornwall, Vermont and attended Norwich University. He studied law with Horatio Seymour of Vermont. Baxter was admitted to the Wisconsin and Minnesota bars. He moved to Minnesota in 1857 and live in Glencoe, Minnesota and then in Chaska, Minnesota. He started the Glencoe Register newspaper with his brother. Baxter lived in Shakopee, Minnesota with his wife and family. Luther served in the 4th Minnesota Infantry Regiment during the American Civil War and was commissioned a colonel. He served as a United States Attorney and as a county attorney for Carver County, Minnesota. Baxter also served as a probate judge. He served in the Minnesota Senate from 1865 to 1868 and from 1870 to 1874 and in the Minnesota House of Representatives in 1969, in 1875, and from 1879 to 1882. Baxter was a Democrat. He died at his home in Fergus Falls, Minnesota and was buried in Chaska, Minnesota.

References

1832 births
1915 deaths
People from Cornwall, Vermont
People from Chaska, Minnesota
People from Shakopee, Minnesota
Editors of Minnesota newspapers
People of Minnesota in the American Civil War
Norwich University alumni
Minnesota state court judges
Minnesota lawyers
Wisconsin lawyers
Democratic Party members of the Minnesota House of Representatives
Democratic Party Minnesota state senators